Laertes was a town of ancient Cilicia. Some have supposed that the philosopher Diogenes Laërtius was from this town. Strabo called it a stronghold.

Its site is located near Cebelires, in Asiatic Turkey. Archaeologists have excavated the site; antiquities may be found at the Alanya Archaeological Museum.

References

Populated places in ancient Cilicia
Former populated places in Turkey
History of Antalya Province
Archaeological sites in Turkey
Ancient Greek archaeological sites in Turkey